Staplefield  is a village in the Mid Sussex District  of West Sussex, England, situated  north-west of Haywards Heath on the B2114 road. It is part of Ansty and Staplefield civil parish where the 2011 Census population information is included.

The Anglican parish church built in 1847 is dedicated to St. Mark and contains wall paintings by the Victorian stained glass designer Charles Eamer Kempe. In 1994, Reverend Anthony Freeman, vicar of St Mark's was dismissed by the Bishop of Chichester, Eric Kemp, when he stated that he didn't believe in God and published his book God in Us: A Case for Christian Humanism. He is currently managing editor of The Journal of Consciousness Studies.

The village also has a Roman Catholic church dedicated to Our Lady of Fatima.

There are two public houses, The Jolly Tanners and The Victory Inn, the latter is named after the legal victory in gaining permission to be a pub not after Horatio Nelson's flagship, Victory, despite his sister, Catherine Matcham, living in nearby Slaugham. The pub sign shows a picture of a judge and a document inside the pub shows details of the case. There is also a red park next to the pubs. The pubs are adjacent to the village green and cricket pitch.

References

External links
Photographs of St. Mark’s church
Staplefield Home Guard Auxiliary Unit

Villages in West Sussex
Mid Sussex District